Suut Kemal Yetkin (born 13 September 1903, Urfa - 18 April 1980), was a Turkish academician, writer, essayist, university administrator.

Biography 
He was the congressman of Urfa in the Grand National Assembly of Turkey (1st Term). His father was Şeyh Saffet Efendi, and he was the father-in-law of İlhan Öztrak, who served as the Secretary-General of the Presidency during the periods of Ministry of State, Fahri Korutürk and İhsan Sabri Çağlayangil.

Education 
He completed his primary education in Istanbul and his secondary and high school education at Galatasaray High School. He graduated from high school in 1925 and was sent to France after winning the state scholarship competition to study abroad that year. He studied philosophy at University of Paris in France. After returning to Turkey, he worked as a teacher in various high schools and teacher schools. In 1934, he was appointed to the newly established School of Language and History – Geography as an associate professor of Aesthetics and Art History. In 1939, he worked as the General Director of Fine Arts at the Ministry of National Education.

Career 
He entered political life in 1939. Parliament VII. Term and Parliament VIII., he served as an Urfa Deputy of the Republican People's Party. He was not elected in the 1950s elections. He returned to academic life as a professor of Islamic Arts in Faculty of Theology at Ankara University.

He was the Rector of Ankara University between 1959-1963. He was the dean of Ankara University Faculty of Theology twice.

Bibliography 

 Şiir Üzerine Düşünceler
 Günlerin Götürdüğü
 Yokuşa Doğru
 Düşün Payı
 Edebiyat Üzerine
 Yarına İnanmak
 Yazılanı Yaşama
 Canım Kitap
 Büyük Tedirginler (Mustaripler)
 Estetik (1931)
 Metafizik (1932)
 Sanat Felsefesi (1934)
 Filozof ve Sanat (1935) 

 Ahmet Haşim ve Sembolizm (1938) 
 Edebî Meslekler (1941) 
 Estetik Dersleri Cilt:1 Estetik Tarihi (1942) 
 Sanat Meseleleri (1945) 
 Sanat Tarihi (1945) 
 Leonardo da Vinci'nin Sanatı (1945) 
 İslâm Mimarisi (1954)
 Büyük Ressamlar (1955) 
 Baduleaire ve Kötülük Çiçekleri (1967) 
 Türk Mimarisi (1970) 
 Estetik Doktrinler (1972) 
 İslâm Ülkelerinde Sanat (1974) 
 Barok Sanat (1976) 
 Estetik ve Ana Sorunlar (1979).

References

Notes 

1930 births
1995 deaths
Turkish-language writers
Turkish erotic artists
Academic staff of Ankara University
Rectors of Ankara University
People from Şanlıurfa
Turkish politicians